Xeropicta derbentina is a species of gastropods belonging to the family Geomitridae.

Distribution

The species is found around the Mediterranean and near Black Sea.

References

 Krynicki, J. A. (1836). Helices proprie dictae hucusque in limitibus Imperii Rossici observatae. Bulletin de la Société Impériale des Naturalistes de Moscou. 9: 145-214. Moskva.
 De Mattia, W. (2007). Xeropicta derbentina (Krynicky, 1836) (Gastropoda, Hygromiidae) in Italy and along the Croatian coast, with notes on its systematics and nomenclature. Basteria. 71 (1/3): 1-12. Leiden
 Sysoev, A. V. & Schileyko, A. A. (2009). Land snails and slugs of Russia and adjacent countries. Sofia/Moskva (Pensoft). 312 pp., 142 plates
 de Mattia, W. & Pešić, V. (2014). Xeropicta (Gastropoda, Hygromiidae) goes west: the first record of X. krynicki (Krynicki, 1833) for Montenegro, with a description of its shell and genital morphology, and an additional record of X. derbentina (Krynicki, 1836) for Italy. Ecologia Montenegrina. 1(4): 193-200
 Bank, R. A.; Neubert, E. (2017). Checklist of the land and freshwater Gastropoda of Europe. Last update: July 16th, 2017

External links
 Pfeiffer, L. (1870-1871). Diagnosen neuer Landschnecken. Malakozoologische Blätter. Cassel (Theodor Fischer). 17 (2): 93-94 [Juli 1870; 17 (3): 141-145]

Geomitridae